Herguijuela de la Sierra is a village and municipality in the province of Salamanca, western Spain, part of the autonomous community of Castilla y León. It is known, besides for its and other towns in the area's quaint old village air, for having a several-hundred-year-old beech tree nearby, one of two in all of western-central Spain.

Geography
The Sierra de Francia Park is situated in the municipality.

References

Municipalities in the Province of Salamanca